IndieCade is an international juried festival of independent games.  IndieCade is known as "the video game industry's Sundance."  At IndieCade, independent video game developers are selected to screen and promote their work at the annual IndieCade festival and showcase events.  In 2009, IndieCade launched a conference track featuring classes, panels, workshops, and keynotes. The conference has since become a major attraction for indie developers and others in the industry.

Background 

IndieCade was formed by Creative Media Collaborative, an alliance of industry producers and leaders founded in 2005. IndieCade's board of advisors includes (among others) Seamus Blackley, Tracy Fullerton, Megan Gaiser, Andy Gavin, Carl Goodman, John Hight, Robin Hunicke, Henry Jenkins, Richard Lemarchand, Frans Mayra, Jamil Moledina, Janet Murray, Robert Nashak, Carolyn Rauch, Kellee Santiago, Keita Takahashi, Will Wright (game designer), and Eric Zimmerman. IndieCade founder is Stephanie Barish, Festival Chair is Celia Pearce, and Festival Director is Sam Roberts.

The festival started as part of E3 before being spun off as an independent event in Bellevue, Washington. In 2009 the festival moved to Culver City, where a Twitter game and an "urban" scavenger hunt were part of the festivities.

The Indiecade festival is the only stand-alone festival for independent games in the United States, and open to the public.  Games are submitted for consideration to the IndieCade festival jury in the early spring and a selection of finalists for the culminating annual IndieCade festival is determined and announced by the fall.  Additional games from the pool of IndieCade submissions are showcased at a variety of events each year around the world. 2009 IndieCade showcase events included E3, the Ottawa International Animation Festival (OIAF) partnered with the IndieCade organization "that focuses on independent games and works to cultivate innovation and artistry in interactive media" in 2009, and an independent video gaming ("IndieCade Europe") festival has been held in the United Kingdom in 2007-2009 at Gamecity. In 2016 IndieCade Europe was rebooted and took place in that year and 2017 in Paris, where it will return in 2018.

Location and Dates 

In 2009, IndieCade moved its flagship stand-alone festival from Bellevue, Washington to Culver City (Los Angeles), California. Each year, IndieCade "invades" downtown Culver City to create a "city-sized arcade". The festival transforms a central blacktop parking lot on Main Street, leveraging the open space by building temporary structures that host parties, individual games, and planned and spontaneous Big Games.

Festival events 

Showcase

The IndieCade showcase is the heart of the IndieCade festival and consists of approximately 40 finalist games selected for their creativity, unique vision, and technological innovation. The showcase involves both digital and physical games.

Previously, the this main showcase was known as the "Game Walk" with several games exhibited in various locations across downtown Culver City: the fire station, NextSpace coworking offices, and the Gregg Fleishman Studio, all turned into temporary galleries for the festival. It is free and open to the public.

Night Games

Night Games is IndieCade's most popular signature event, an evening centered large-scale physical and hybrid games played outside after dark. Examples of game types include single-player experiences played on a giant screen in front of an audience (SuperHyperCube), multiplayer games that use only certain mechanics such as glowing wands or laser pointers (Johann Sebastian Joust, Renga), and large performance pieces involving many players (Humanoid Asteroids). IndieCade promotes Night Games to feature the beauty and innovation of modern game design in all forms, outside the label of what are commonly perceived to be "traditional" games.

Big Games

The Big Games program serves as an extension to IndieCade's mission to promote games of all kinds. Big Games are large, multi-player games played outside and involving physical activity, and range to include technology, tactics, and personal interaction. Big Games are curated by on-site docents, and presents projects such as Ninja (a turn based game of tag), Reality (an Alternate Reality game), and Meatspace Invasion (a mixed virtual/real-world tag/shooting style game). It is free and open to the public.

Annual events 

The first IndieCade Mobile 3D Game Jam was hosted in Los Angeles at the University of Southern California's Interactive Media Division on August 6–7, 2011. During the two-day event, 12 teams began the process of creating a fully functional 3D mobile game for the LG Thrill 4G. 6 finalists were chosen to go on to the next round of refining their games in order to compete for the LG Mobile 3D Award at the Red Carpet Award Ceremonies.

The first annual IndieCade Holiday Party took place at Riot Games (League of Legends) headquarters in Santa Monica on December 14, 2011. The fundraiser featured postcard art sent in by the community, available for sale by silent auction. The art show was curated by Glitch Lab. Notable art contributors were Pendleton Ward (creator of Adventure Time), Jason Torchinsky, as well as Amanda Williams and Katherine Rubenstein.

IndieCade awards ceremony 

Approximately 40 games each year are selected to exhibit at GameWalk. The finalists are eligible to compete in IndieCade's Red Carpet Awards. Audience Choice and Developer Choice Awards are announced separately during the festival's Closing Party.

Awards categories include:

 Best In Show
 Best Story/World Design
 Best Technology
 Best Gameplay Design
 Best Visuals
 Best Sound
 Best Interaction
 Community Impact
 Special Recognition

See also
Independent Games Festival

References

External links

Animation film festivals in the United Kingdom
Animation film festivals in the United States
Festivals established in 2005
Indie video game festivals